Palmers may refer to:

 Palmers, Minnesota, United States, an unincorporated community
 Palmers College, a sixth form college located on the outskirts of Grays, Thurrock
 Palmers Shipbuilding and Iron Company, a British shipbuilding company established in 1852
 Palmers Garden Centre, New Zealand garden retail chain
 Palmers Textil AG, Austria's largest textile producer

See also
 Palmer's College, Thurrock, Essex, England
 Palmer (disambiguation)